The Russian Superleague (Russian Championship Superleague), commonly abbreviated as RSL, was the highest division of the main professional ice hockey league in Russia. It was considered the second-best league in the world, after the National Hockey League (NHL) of North America. It was a part of the Russian Pro Hockey League which was composed of three divisions — the Superleague, Major League (Vysshaya Liga), and First League (Pervaya Liga).

The league was rebranded after the 2007/2008 season as the KHL. The KHL absorbed all 20 teams from the previous RSL season, for a total of 24 for its inaugural campaign.

History
The origins of the Superleague are in the old Soviet League, which was founded in 1946. The Soviet era was dominated by the Red Army-affiliated CSKA Moscow, who won 32 of the 46 championships. The league lasted until 1992 due to the Soviet Union's collapse. After its transformation into the International Hockey League, the league was rechristened the Russian Hockey League in 1996. From 1996 to 1999, league membership was Russian-only. In 1999, membership was open and the league went international, and was renamed the Russian Superleague. Journalist Vsevolod Kukushkin acted as a press secretary for the league.

Teams (2007–08)

There were 20 teams in the Superleague in 2007–08.

 Amur Khabarovsk
 Avangard Omsk
 Ak Bars Kazan
 CSKA Moscow
 Dynamo Moscow
 Khimik Moscow Oblast
 Lada Togliatti
 Lokomotiv Yaroslavl
 Metallurg Magnitogorsk
 Metallurg Novokuznetsk
 MVD Moscow Oblast
 Neftekhimik Nizhnekamsk
 Salavat Yulaev Ufa
 Severstal Cherepovets
 Sibir Novosibirsk
 SKA Saint Petersburg
 Spartak Moscow
 Torpedo Nizhny Novgorod
 Traktor Chelyabinsk
 Vityaz Chekhov

Competition
The competition consisted of the regular season and the play-off. The games were played in accordance with the International Ice Hockey Federation (IIHF) rules.

During the regular season, each team faced each other team three times (twice at home/once away, or once at home/twice away). Each team played 57 games during the regular season. If a game was drawn, a five-minute sudden-death overtime was played, followed by a shootout. Three points were awarded for a win in regulation, two points for an overtime or shootout win, one point for an overtime or shootout loss, and no points for a loss in regulation.

The 16 teams with the best regular-season records qualified for the playoffs. Each playoff round was a best-of-five series. In each round, the teams were paired according to the regular season performance. The top team was paired with the bottom team, the second-ranked team was paired with the team with the second worst regular-season performance, and so on. The higher-ranked team played Games One, Two, and Five on home ice.

Champions

Russian Super League champions
 2008 — Salavat Yulaev Ufa
 2007 — Metallurg Magnitogorsk
 2006 — Ak Bars Kazan
 2005 — Dynamo Moscow
 2004 — Avangard Omsk
 2003 — Lokomotiv Yaroslavl
 2002 — Lokomotiv Yaroslavl
 2001 — Metallurg Magnitogorsk
 2000 — Dynamo Moscow
 1999 — Metallurg Magnitogorsk
 1998 — Ak Bars Kazan (Cup of Russia — Metallurg Magnitogorsk)
 1997 — Torpedo Yaroslavl (since 2000 named as Lokomotiv Yaroslavl)

Players with most championships

Four-time winners:
 Igor Shadilov 2000, 2005, 2006, 2008
 Alexei Tereshchenko 2000, 2005, 2006, 2008
 Vladimir Antipov 1997, 2002, 2003, 2008

Video games
Teams from the league are playable in NHL 09.

See also
 Russian Elite Hockey Scoring Champion
 Russian Elite Hockey Goal Scoring Champion

References

 Russian Super League 

 
Sports leagues established in 1999
Organizations disestablished in 2008
Defunct ice hockey leagues in Russia
1999 establishments in Russia
2008 disestablishments in Russia